The International School of Ulaanbaatar, usually referred to as ISU, or Улаанбаатар дахь Олон Улсын Дунд Сургууль(in Mongolian Language), in Ulaanbaatar, Mongolia, is a private, coeducational day school, which offers an educational program from preschool through grade 12 for students of all nationalities. 
Permission to run the school was granted by the Mongolian Ministry of Education in May 1992. 

The school is governed by a multi-national board, including representatives of parents and embassies. As of May, 2015, there are currently 96 staff members (50 Mongolian, 46 foreign-hires). Most of the school's income derives from tuition, with some additional funding by the US Government.

On Friday, September 14, 2012, ISU celebrated the 20th anniversary of its founding.  The ceremony was attended by the Mayor of Ulaanbaatar, the Minister of Foreign Affairs as well as the Ambassadors from the Embassies of Canada, China, United States of America and other dignitaries such as representatives from the US Department of State and foreign and local Mongolian firms.

External links 
 International School of Ulaanbaatar, official site

Educational institutions established in 1992
Schools in Mongolia
Ulaanbaatar
Association of China and Mongolia International Schools
1992 establishments in Mongolia